Indzhe Voyvoda (c. 1755, Sliven – 1821, Sculeni) was a renowned Bulgarian leader (voivod) of an armed band of outlaws (hajduks) in Ottoman-held Bulgaria. He mainly operated in the mountainous regions of Strandzha, Sakar and the eastern Balkan Mountains.

During the feudal seditions in the Ottoman Empire, Stoyan (his nickname Indzhe comes from Ottoman Turkish ince, "slim") became the leader of a large gang of robbers. His band attempted to attack and rob the town of Kotel, but its inhabitants erected a three-metre high wall and drove them back. He later gave up robbing and began to patronize the poor Bulgarian population, according to one legend leading an insurrection in the early 19th century. In 1806 Indzhe moved to Moldova, where he enrolled in the local rulers' guard and continued to fight against the Ottomans, until dying in 1821 in the Battle of Sculeni.

He is still remembered in Bulgarian folklore, and many folk songs honour him. The Bulgarian village of Indzhe Voyvoda in the Strandzha Mountain is named in his memory.

Bibliography
 Narodni pesni za Indzhe voivoda, M. Petrov,  (Народни песни за Индже войвода, Петров, Милю)

External links
Brief biography of Индже войвода (in Bulgarian)
Индже войвода folklore (in Bulgarian)
Plamen Pavlov. "Zaplakala e gorata..." Poznatijat i nepoznat Indzhe(in Bulgarian)

1755 births
1821 deaths
People from Sliven
Bulgarian revolutionaries
Military personnel killed in action
18th-century Bulgarian people
19th-century Bulgarian people
Thracian Bulgarians